James Henry Douglas (died 1 May 1905) was an Australian politician.

A pastoralist and the owner of North Yanco Station before entering politics, he served from 1880 to 1882 in the New South Wales Legislative Assembly for Murrumbidgee. He later moved to Scotland, where he rented the seat of the Earl of Abercrombie, and died there in 1905.

References

 

Year of birth missing
1905 deaths
Members of the New South Wales Legislative Assembly